Artist of My Soul is the eighteenth studio album by Christian singer Sandi Patty, released in 1997 on Word Records. It was produced by Robbie Buchanan, whose production, arrangement and keyboardist credits include artists like Amy Grant, Whitney Houston, Rascal Flatts and Neil Diamond. The album peaked at number 3 on the Heatseekers Albums, number 7 on the Top Christian Albums and number 155 on the Top 200 Albums charts in Billboard magazine. Artist of My Soul won Inspirational Album of the Year at the 29th GMA Dove Awards.

Track listing

Personnel 
 Sandi Patty – vocals, backing vocals (3)
 Robbie Buchanan – acoustic piano, synthesizers, Hammond B3 organ, arrangements 
 Michael Landau – guitars 
 Neil Stubenhaus – bass 
 Mike Baird – drums 
 Sandra Crouch – tambourine (7)
 Steve Tavaglione – soprano saxophone (3)
 The London Studio Orchestra – orchestra (1, 2, 4, 5, 6, 8-11)
 Tom Howard – orchestrations (1, 2, 5, 6, 11)
 Bob Krogstad – arrangements (4, 8, 9, 10), orchestrations (4, 8, 9, 10)
 Rolf Wilson – concertmaster (1, 2, 4, 5, 6, 8-11)
 Orion Crawford – music preparation 
 Warren Stayner – backing vocals (3)
 Faith Central Missionary Baptist Church – choir (7)
 Barbara Allen – choir director (7)

Production
 Matt Baugher – executive producer 
 Robbie Buchanan – producer 
 Brent Bourgeois – A&R direction 
 Bubba Smith – A&R direction 
 Jeremy Smith – recording 
 Dick Lewzey – orchestra recording 
 Bill Buckingham – additional recording 
 KojI Egawa – tracking and vocal recording assistant 
 Nick Harris – orchestra recording assistant 
 Scott Erickson – overdub and BGV recording assistant, production coordinator 
 Johnny Q – overdub and BGV recording assistant
 Bill Schnee – mixing at The Factory Studios (Vancouver, British Columbia, Canada)
 Ryen Froggatt – mix assistant 
 Doug Sax – mastering at The Mastering Lab (Hollywood, California)
 Linda Bourne Wornell – A&R coordinator 
 Beth Lee – art direction 
 Gina Binkley – design 
 Russ Harrington – photography

Critical reception 

Rodney Batdorf of AllMusic wrote "Although it might not be as ambitious as some of her other '90s records, 'Artist of My Soul' is a typically fine record from Sandi Patty that expertly showcases her smooth voice, her easy way with a melody, and her boundless spiritual faith."

Mike Rimmer of Cross Rhythms rated Artist of My Soul 8 out of 10 writing that the album is "definitely inspiring, well produced with some excellent songs and if you like your pop music easy on the ear, this is for you." Rimmer also pointed out that the "poppy gospel flavourings of 'You Alone' and the gentle wonder of 'Speechless' are high points."

Charts

Radio singles

Accolades 
GMA Dove Awards

References

1997 albums
Sandi Patty albums
Word Records albums